Siegfried Lorenz (born 30 August 1945) is a German baritone who performs opera, oratorio and Lied. A member of the Komische Oper Berlin and later the Staatsoper Unter den Linden, he made award-winning recordings and appeared as a guest internationally. He has been an academic voice teacher in Berlin and Hamburg.

Career 
Born in East Berlin, Lorenz studied voice in his hometown at the Hochschule für Musik "Hanns Eisler" from 1964 to 1969, where he was a master student of Alois Orth. After receiving several prizes at international singing competitions, Lorenz was engaged as a lyrical baritone at the Komische Oper Berlin by Walter Felsenstein in 1969. In 1973, he became the first vocal soloist at the Gewandhaus in Leipzig, a position which Kurt Masur created for him. He performed and recorded several cantatas by Johann Sebastian Bach and became known as a Lied singer. His recordings of songs by Franz Schubert received several awards.

From 1978 to 1992, Lorenz was first lyrical baritone at the Staatsoper Berlin in Berlin. He appeared successfully as Wolfram in Wagner's Tannhäuser, as the Count in Mozart's Die Hochzeit des Figaro, as Posa in Verdi's Don Carlos, and as Borromeo in Hans Pfitzner's Palestrina, among others.

He recorded Mahler's Kindertotenlieder with the Gewandhausorchester and Masur, and Schubert song cycles with pianist Norman Shetler. English music critic Alan Blyth reviewed Die Winterreise for Gramophone and noted: "He sings with pleasing, consistently firm tone and with an enviable control of line and dynamics. The range of his voice is not so large as Fischer-Dieskau's, a singer from whom he has learnt so much, but within its smaller compass he can achieve almost the same power and intensity."  Recordings of Schubert songs between 1974 and 1987 were combined to form a collection covering 151 of his songs. A reviewer wrote that Lorenz "penetrated Schubert's songs for many years and this eight-CD box is the result of assiduous study and a long-term plan".

Lorenz recorded the role of Beckmesser in Wagner's Die Meistersinger von Nürnberg, alongside Ben Heppner, Cheryl Studer and Bernd Weikl, conducted by Wolfgang Sawallisch, Bach's solo cantatas for bass Ich will den Kreuzstab gerne tragen and Ich habe genug with the Neues Bachisches Collegium Musicum conducted by Max Pommer, Mahlers's Lieder eines fahrenden Gesellen conducted by Günther Herbig, and his Fünf Lieder nach Friedrich Rückert with the Staatskapelle Berlin conducted by Otmar Suitner.

Lorenz performed as a guest in Europe, the US and Japan. In 1976, he was awarded the Kunstpreis, and in 1983 the National Prize of the German Democratic Republic. In 1979, he was appointed Kammersänger of the Staatsoper in Berlin, and in 1982 professor. From 2001 to 2003, he was professor of voice at the Musikhochschule Hamburg, and from October 2003 at the Universität der Künste Berlin.

Awards 
 1976 Kunstpreis of the GDR, Preis der Deutschen Schallplattenkritik for three recordings of Schubert's song cycles
 1979 Kammersänger
 National Prize of the German Democratic Republic (III. Klasse für Kunst und Literatur, 1983)

Recordings 
 Gustav Mahler: Fünf Lieder nach Friedrich Rückert. Four songs from Des Knaben Wunderhorn (1984)

References

External links 
 
 Siegfried Lorenz / Biography by Erik Eriksson AllMusic
 Siegfried Lorenz (Baritone) Bach Cantatas Website
 Siegfried Lorenz / Interview, 10/2010: Siegfried Lorenz, Der Staat war nun einmal da! Der neue Merker, October 2010
 Lorenz Siegfried / baritono Operissimo
 Bariton Siegfried Lorenz wordt 70 jaar operanederland.nl, 30 August 2015
 Hochamt am Imbißstand / Spitzengagen auf der Beletage, Demontage an der Basis – in Ost-Berlins Deutscher Staatsoper herrscht Disharmonie.  Der Spiegel 21 October 1991

German operatic baritones
1945 births
Living people
Musicians from Berlin
People from East Berlin